Touchmate is a computer products manufacturing company founded in 1988 by "Vasant Menghani". One of the leading computer product manufacturing company in UAE, it was rated "Best IT Brand of UAE" by Reseller-Magazine in 2012.
 Ranging from products from tablets to smartphones.

References

Computer companies established in 1988